Nikolai Markin (Russian: Николай Григорьевич Маркин, born 21 May 1893 in Gorodishchensky District – 1 October 1918 in the village of Pyany Bor on the River Kama) was a Bolshevik revolutionary and sailor. When he was young his parents had been textile workers in one of the factories in Penza province but they subsequently moved to Vladikavkaz.

References

1893 births
1918 deaths
People of the Russian Civil War
People of the Russian Revolution